SV Marion Lightbody was a Russian full-rigged ship that was torpedoed by the Imperial German submarine  in the Atlantic Ocean near the Fastnet Rock on 8 July 1915 while she was travelling from Valparaíso, Chile to Queenstown, Ireland while carrying a cargo of barley.

Construction 
Marion Lightbody was launched on 17 April 1888 and completed the same year at the Henderson D. & W. & Co. Ltd. shipyard in Meadowside, United Kingdom.

Sinking 
Marion Lightbody was travelling from Valparaíso, Chile to Queenstown, Ireland while carrying a cargo of barley when on 8 July 1915, she was torpedoed the Imperial German submarine  in the Atlantic Ocean near the Fastnet Rock. The 25 crewmen escaped the ship in a dinghy and were later picked up by a British patrol boat before being brought to Queenstown.

Wreck 

Gallery

References

1888 ships
Ships built in the United Kingdom
Full-rigged ships
Barques
Four-masted ships
Sailing ships of the United Kingdom
Shipwrecks in the Atlantic Ocean
World War I shipwrecks in the Atlantic Ocean
Ships sunk with no fatalities
Ships sunk by German submarines in World War I